Pavel Alexandrovich Iliashenko (born 23 June 1990 in Ufa, Russian SFSR, Soviet Union) is a modern pentathlete from Kazakhstan. He competed at the 2012 Summer Olympics in London, where he finished twenty-ninth in the men's event, with a score of 5,432 points.  At the 2016 Summer Olympics, he finished in 35th place.

Iliashenko also won a silver medal at the 2011 UIPM Junior World Championships in Buenos Aires, Argentina.

He competed in the men's individual event at the 2018 Asian Games held in Jakarta, Indonesia.

He represented Kazakhstan at the 2020 Summer Olympics.

References

External links
  (archived page from Pentathlon.org)

1990 births
Living people
Kazakhstani male modern pentathletes
Olympic modern pentathletes of Kazakhstan
Modern pentathletes at the 2012 Summer Olympics
Modern pentathletes at the 2016 Summer Olympics
Modern pentathletes at the 2014 Asian Games
Sportspeople from Ufa
Modern pentathletes at the 2018 Asian Games
Asian Games competitors for Kazakhstan
Modern pentathletes at the 2020 Summer Olympics